Changliu railway station is a railway station on the Hainan eastern ring high-speed railway, serving the Changliu township, located in Hainan, China. The station opened on July 1, 2019.

References

Railway stations in Hainan
Railway stations in China opened in 2019